Doctor Strange is a series of several comic book volumes featuring the character Doctor Strange and published by Marvel Comics, beginning with the original Doctor Strange comic book series that debuted in 1968.

Publication history

Doctor Strange vol. 1
The original Strange Tales series ended with issue #168 (May 1968). The following month, Doctor Strange's adventures continued in the full-length Doctor Strange #169, with Nick Fury moving to the newly launched Nick Fury, Agent of S.H.I.E.L.D.

Expanded to 20 pages per issue, the Doctor Strange solo series ran 15 issues, #169-183 (June 1968 – November 1969), continuing the numbering of Strange Tales. Roy Thomas wrote the run of new stories, joined after the first three issues by the art team of penciler Gene Colan and inker Tom Palmer through the end. Colan drastically altered the look of the series, as Thomas recounted: "... he had his own view of what these other worlds should look like. Everyone else sort of copied Ditko's versions of those extra dimensions, which were great and wonderful. When Gene came on, he didn't feel a real rapport with that, I guess, so his extra dimensions tended to be just blackness and smoke and things of that sort... Sometimes it was a little strange for a dimension Doc Strange had been to before to look different when drawn by Gene, but nobody complained." Thomas recalled in 2000 that he returned to work a day late from a weekend comic book convention to find that Marvel production manager Sol Brodsky had assigned Doctor Strange to writer Archie Goodwin, newly ensconced at Marvel and writing Iron Man. Thomas convinced Brodsky to allow him to continue writing the title. "I got very possessive about Doctor Strange," Thomas recalled. "It wasn't a huge seller, but [by the time it was canceled] we were selling the low 40 percent range of more than 400,000 print run, so it was actually selling a couple hundred thousand copies [but] at the time you needed to sell even more."

Doctor Strange: Master of the Mystic Arts
Doctor Strange's feature in the Marvel Premiere series segued to the character's second ongoing title, Doctor Strange: Master of the Mystic Arts, also known as Doctor Strange vol. 2, which ran 81 issues (June 1974 – February 1987). Doctor Strange #14 featured a crossover story with The Tomb of Dracula #44, another series that was being drawn by Gene Colan at the time. In Englehart's final story, he sent Dr. Strange back in time to meet Benjamin Franklin. In 2010, Comics Bulletin ranked Englehart's work on Doctor Strange with artists Frank Brunner and Colan ninth on its list of the "Top 10 1970s Marvels."

The series ended with a cliffhanger as his home, the Sanctum Sanctorum, was heavily damaged during a battle. The title was discontinued so that the character's adventures could be transferred to another split-book-format series, Strange Tales vol. 2 #1–19 (April 1987 – October 1988), which was shared with Cloak and Dagger.

Doctor Strange: Sorcerer Supreme
Strange was returned to his own series, this time titled Doctor Strange: Sorcerer Supreme, which ran 90 issues (November 1988 – June 1996). The initial creative team was writer Peter B. Gillis and artists Richard Case and Randy Emberlin, with storylines often spanning multiple issues. During this time the series became part of the "Midnight Sons" group of Marvel's supernatural comics.

Jackson Guice's cover for Doctor Strange #15 (1990) used Christian music singer Amy Grant's likeness without her permission, leading to a complaint saying that the cover gave the appearance that she was associating with witchcraft. A US District Court sealed an out-of-court settlement between Grant and Marvel in early 1991 with a consent decree in which Marvel did not admit to liability or wrongdoing.

Doctor Strange vol. 3
As part of the Marvel Knights imprint, the third volume of Doctor Strange was released in 1999. Given the subtitle Flight of Bones, the volume was written by Dan Jolley and Tony Harris, and briefly ran for four issues.

Doctor Strange vol. 4
In 2015, Jason Aaron and Chris Bachalo teamed up for the fourth volume of Doctor Strange. Writers Dennis Hopeless and Penciler Niko Henrichon took charge during the Secret Empire event in issues 21-24, with Bachalo still providing covers. Writer John Barber and Penciler Niko Henrichon took charge for issues 25-26. After the Marvel Legacy renumbering, writer Donny Cates and pencilers Frazer Irving and Chip Zdarsky took over at issues #381-390.

Doctor Strange vol. 5
A fifth Doctor Strange series was launched by writer Mark Waid and artist Jesus Saiz in August 2018.

Doctor Strange vol. 6
A short-lived sixth series, Doctor Strange: Surgeon Supreme, launched in December 2019 by writer Mark Waid and artist Kev Walker follows immediately after the storyline completed in the fifth series.  The series was cancelled after six issues.

Strange vol. 3
Another short lived series, this one coming after the Miniseries event "Death of Doctor Strange", it follows the work of Steven's estranged wife, Clea Strange as she works her duality as a sorcerer supreme of both the Dark Dimension and our own now, and attempts to thwart the antagonistic Blasphemy cartel's continuous resurrection of power foes as enhanced "revenants" and trying to assemble whom the mysterious "Harvestman" is!

Doctor Strange vol. 7
This series, headed by Jed Mckay and Pasqual Ferry will feature the continued trials and tribulations of the recently revivified Stephen Strange as well as to Clea's position in the series.

Timeline
Doctor Strange is featured or co-featured in the ongoing series:
Strange Tales #110–111, #114–168 (July–Aug. 1963, (Nov. 1963May 1968)
Doctor Strange #169–183 (June 1968Nov. 1969)
Marvel Premiere #3–14 (July 1972March 1974)
Doctor Strange vol. 2 #1–81 [#184–264] (June 1974Feb. 1987)
Strange Tales vol. 2 #1–19 (April 1987Oct. 1988)
Doctor Strange: Sorcerer Supreme #1–90 [#265–354] (Nov. 1988June 1996)
Doctor Strange vol. 3 #1–4 (Feb.-May 1999)
Doctor Strange vol. 4 #1–26 [#355–380] (Dec. 2015Dec. 2017)
Doctor Strange and the Sorcerers Supreme (Dec. 2016Nov. 2017)
Doctor Strange #381–390 (Jan.–July 2018)
Doctor Strange vol. 5 #1–20 [Leg. #391-410(Aug. 2018Dec. 2019)
Dr. Strange #1–6 [Leg. 411-416] (Feb.–Oct. 2020)
Strange vol.3" #1-10 [Leg. #417-426] (May. 2022-February 2023)
Doctror Strange vol. 6 #1-current  [Leg. #427-present](March 2023-present)

Collected editions

See also
 Strange (comic book)
 Strange Academy

References

Works cited

External links
 Doctor Strange (1968) at the Comic Book DB

1968 comics debuts
1969 comics endings
1974 comics debuts
1987 comics endings
1988 comics debuts
1996 comics endings
1999 comics debuts
1999 comics endings
Comics by Chris Claremont
Comics by Don McGregor
Comics by J. M. DeMatteis
Comics by Mark Waid
Comics by Marv Wolfman
Comics by Roger Stern
Comics by Steve Englehart
Doctor Strange titles